The Government Engineering College, Gandhinagar (GECG) was established in 2004 to give higher education in engineering and technology. The institute is recognized by the All India Council of Technical Education (AICTE), New Delhi, and the Institute of Engineers (India). The college is administered by the Directorate of Technical Education of Gujarat State in Gandhinagar, and is affiliated with Gujarat Technological University (GTU). Earlier, all the courses of this college were taught according to the GTU syllabus and exams were also taken by GTU but since 2013, it received autonomous status along with six other government engineering colleges and started taking exams on their own. Results and certificates are still given by GTU.

In November 2007, the college moved to its new campus at Sec-28, near GEB, inaugurated by Smt. Anandiben Patel, Minister for Higher and Technical Education.

General
The candidates who have passed the HSC examination (Science Stream) by the Gujarat Higher-Secondary/Central Board of Higher Secondary (within Gujarat state only) with Physics, Chemistry, Mathematics subjects as group A, are eligible for admission.

The ACPC Centralised Admission Committee constituted by the government of Gujarat fills up 100% of total seats on merit basis of total of Normalized Merit Rank (obtained from 60% of H.S.C. Examination + 40% of GUJCET Examination conducted by GSEB as for academic year 2018–2019)

Departments 
The college offers seven undergraduate courses leading to Bachelor of Engineering (B.E.) degrees (number of seats in brackets): 
 Electronics and Communication Engineering (120),
 Computer Engineering (120),
 Information Technology (60),
 Biomedical Engineering (120), 
 Instrumentation and Control Engineering (120), 
 Metallurgy Engineering (60),

The college also offers two postgraduate courses leading to Master of Engineering (M.E.) degrees (number of seats in brackets):
 Biomedical Engineering (18),
 Computer Engineering (18),

Department of Electronics & Communication Engineering
Department of Electronics & Communication Engineering is well posed to cater the needs of the course. It is equipped with well-developed laboratories to satisfy the course curriculum of various subjects related especially to the Computer field.

Besides the studies, EC students have participated in various events at national level technical competition regularly and have won prizes. EC Club has been formed and very active. Numbers of activities are being conducted by the EC Club.

The department is well equipped to cater to the needs of existing strength as well as additional strength of 30 students.

Department of Instrumentation and Control  Engineering
The Instrumentation and Control Engineering Department started with the opening of the college in 2004. The department offers an undergraduate course B.E.(Instrumentation and Control). Department has well equipped labs for Signal and System, Measurement, Instrumentation, Power electronics as well as PLC's which helps to enhance the practical skills of the student. The students from this department have also got placed in global giants in Instrumentation and Control like Yokogawa. The well experienced faculties helps to keep the student updated with the latest trends of Instrumentation and Control in Industries.

Campus

Facilities
 College provides hostel in campus for boys and girls
 Boys hostel is having 94 rooms (per room three students) with capacity of 282.
 Girls hostel is having 60 rooms (per room three students) with capacity of 180
 College share a classrooms for Indian Institute of Information Technology, Vadodara
 Students can access free internet from Wi-fi
 GEC-Gn Alumni Association in college. Which passed out students encourage and assist the students of institute for various curricular activities.
 A GYM building is available for GYM activities. The students conduct sports, indoor games, social services, cultural activities, and debates in it. Blood donation camps are organized.
 The canteen provides food to the students and the staff.  
 The 100-seat auditorium and C.V.Raman Hall used for technical events, lectures and seminars
 Student stores supply items such as stationery and calculators. The students co-operatively run the store on the college premises.

Training and placement 
A training and placement cell is in touch with industry. Many former students in various multinational companies.

Examination system 
Examination System is according to Gujarat Technological University Scheme.

Internal examination
Internal examination, submission of term work and university external examination, together make an individual eligible for passing (for each subject).

All have to appear for the internal examination. For passing, a minimum 40% marks are required. Students scoring less than 40% marks will have to submit an assignment or have to attend for retake exam given by the subject professor.

University examination
The university examination is conducted at the end of every semester/year for the subjects. Minimum passing standard is 40% in each head. A student securing 30% marks in the theory may be declared passed if the total marks scored in the subject is 45%.

Sources

References
http://www.gecg28.ac.in/
https://dte.gujarat.gov.in/
https://web.archive.org/web/20090612003930/http://www.gujacpc.nic.in/Documents2009/Fee/Tuition%20Fee%20link%20for%20BE%20BTech.pdf 
http://www.gtu.ac.in/affiliation/Affiliated_Colleges_BE_2009-10.pdf 
https://web.archive.org/web/20100331053105/http://gujaratuniversity.org.in/web/NWD/0100_Gujarat%20University%20Affiliated%20Colleges/0910_Gujarat_University_Affiliated_Colleges_List%20%282009-2010%29.pdf
https://web.archive.org/web/20120818084526/http://www.jacpcldce.ac.in/Adm09/Inst_Engg_09.htm
https://web.archive.org/web/20120226020748/http://www.jacpcldce.ac.in/Adm09/InstProfile/115.mht
https://www.ntseguru.in/

Education in Gandhinagar
Universities and colleges in Gujarat
Educational institutions established in 2004
Engineering colleges in Gujarat
Education in India
2004 establishments in Gujarat